Ehab may refer to:

Ehab Abouheif (born 1971), Canadian biologist, Professor in the Department of Biology at McGill University
Ehab Amin (born 1995), Egyptian professional basketball player for Al Ahly
Mohamed Ehab (born 1989), Egyptian weightlifter, and World Champion in the 77 kg category
Ehab Galal, Egyptian former football player and manager
Ehab Moustafa Mansour (born 1968), Egyptian field hockey player
Ehab El Masry (born 1985), Egyptian football striker
Ehab Mohamed (born 1957), Egyptian volleyball player
Ehab Fuad Ahmed Nagi (born 1968), former South Yemen Olympic athlete
Ehab Al Shihabi (born 1970), Jordanian-American media professional with Al Jazeera Media Network
Ehab Tawfik (born 1966), Egyptian singer

See also
Chehab (disambiguation)
Mehtab (disambiguation)